A special agent or federal agent is an investigator or detective for a governmental or independent agency, who primarily serves in criminal investigatory positions. Additionally, many federal and state special agents operate in "criminal intelligence" based roles as well. Within the U.S. federal law enforcement system, dozens of federal agencies employ federal law enforcement officers, each with different criteria pertaining to the use of the titles Special Agent and Agent.

In general, some agents are federal law enforcement officers and hold either arrest authority or the right to conduct minor criminal/non-criminal investigations. In some agencies, however, a special agent may have both criminal and non-criminal investigatory authority but still have no authority to conduct major criminal investigations.

Regardless, most people holding the title of "Special Agent" are law enforcement officers under state or federal law (with some also being dual intelligence operatives such as with the FBI). These law enforcement officers are distinctly empowered to conduct both major and minor criminal investigations, and hold arrest authority.

Additionally, most special agents are authorized to carry firearms both on and off duty due to their status as law enforcement officers. In US federal law enforcement, the title of "Special Agent" is used almost exclusively for federal and military criminal investigators.

Confusingly, in intelligence usage, "agent" also refers to a human source or human "asset" who is recruited, trained, controlled, and employed to obtain and report information. However, within law enforcement agencies, these types of sources are often referred to as informants, confidential informants (CI—not to be confused with counterintelligence) or confidential human sources (CHS).

Alternatively, some state and local government agencies within the United States title their criminal investigators as special investigators.

Federal government
Within the U.S. government, the title of Special Agent primarily designates the Criminal Investigator GS-1811 series position.  However, the title is also concurrently used for General Investigator GS-1810 job series and the intelligence specialist in the GS-0132 job series according to the Office of Personnel Management (OPM) handbook.  The vast majority of special agents are GS-1811 (or equivalent) Criminal Investigators.  Special agents typically have at a minimum an undergraduate degree.

 1811:  Criminal Investigator (Primary Special Agent occupation within the federal government).
1810: General Investigator
 0132: Intelligence

Federal agencies
Most federal agencies, including the following, employ some type of special agent, investigator or background investigator:

 Central Intelligence Agency (CIA)
 Office of Inspector General of the CIA
 Department of Agriculture (USDA)
 United States Forest Service Office of Law Enforcement and Investigations
 Office of Inspector General (USDA-OIG)
 Department of Commerce (USDOC)
 National Oceanic and Atmospheric Administration (NOAA)
 Office of Export Enforcement (OEE)
 Office of Inspector General (DOC-OIG)
 Office of Security (OSY)
 Department of Defense (DOD)
 Air Force Office of Special Investigations (AFOSI)
 Defense Counterintelligence and Security Agency (DCSA)
 Defense Intelligence Agency (DIA)
 Defense Logistics Agency Office of Inspector General (DLA OIG)
 National Security Agency (NSA)
 NSA Office of Inspector General
 Naval Criminal Investigative Service (NCIS)
 Office of Inspector General (DOD-OIG)
 Defense Criminal Investigative Service (DCIS)
 Pentagon Force Protection Agency (PFPA)
 United States Army Counterintelligence (Army CI)
 United States Army Criminal Investigation Command (USACIDC)
 United States Marine Corps Criminal Investigation Division (Marine CID Agent)
 Department of Education (ED)
 Office of Inspector General (ED-OIG)
 Department of Health and Human Services (HHS)
 Food and Drug Administration (FDA)
 FDA Office of Criminal Investigations (OCI)
 Office of Inspector General (HHS-OIG)
 Department of Homeland Security (DHS)
 Coast Guard Investigative Service (CGIS)
 Citizenship and Immigration Services (CIS)
 Customs and Border Protection (CBP)
 Federal Protective Service (FPS)
 Immigration and Customs Enforcement/Homeland Security Investigations (ICE/HSI)
 Office of Inspector General (DHS-OIG)
 Transportation Security Administration (TSA)
 United States Secret Service (USSS)
 Department of the Interior (DOI)
 Bureau of Indian Affairs Police (BIA)
 Bureau of Land Management (BLM)
 National Park Service (NPS)
 Office of Inspector General (DOI-OIG)
 United States Fish and Wildlife Service (USFWS)
 United States Park Police (USPP)
 Department of Justice (DOJ)
 Bureau of Alcohol, Tobacco, Firearms and Explosives (ATF)
 Drug Enforcement Administration (DEA)
 Federal Bureau of Investigation (FBI)
 Federal Bureau of Prisons (BOP)
 Office of Inspector General (DOJ-OIG)
 United States Marshals Service (USMS)
 Department of Energy (DOE) - National Nuclear Security Administration
 Department of Labor, Office of Inspector General (DOL-OIG)
 Department of State
 Diplomatic Security Service (DSS) (FS-2501)
 Office of Inspector General (DOS-OIG)
 Department of Transportation (DOT)
 Federal Aviation Administration (FAA)
 Federal Motor Carrier Safety Administration (FMCSA)
 Office of Inspector General for the Department of Transportation (DOT-OIG)
 Department of the Treasury
 Alcohol and Tobacco Tax and Trade Bureau (TTB)
 Bureau of Engraving and Printing Police
 Federal Reserve Board Police
 IRS Criminal Investigation (IRS-CI)
 Treasury Inspector General for Tax Administration (TIGTA)
 United States Mint Police
 Environmental Protection Agency (EPA)
 Criminal Investigation Division
 Office of Inspector General (EPA-OIG)
 National Aeronautics and Space Administration (NASA)
 Office of Inspector General
 Office of Protective Services
 Office of Personnel Management
 Office of Inspector General (OPM-OIG)
 Postal Service (USPS)
 United States Postal Inspection Service (USPIS – not an Inspector General)
 United States Postal Service Office of Inspector General (USPS-OIG)
 Other
 All 73 federal Offices of Inspector General (OIG), including those listed individually above

Training for the federal criminal investigator
Federal law enforcement training can be divided into various categories, the most common being basic, agency-specific basic (ASB), advanced/specialized, and agency-advanced/specialized. To operate safely and effectively, U.S. Special Agents and criminal investigators must possess skills and knowledge regarding criminal and civil law and procedure, enforcement operations, physical techniques, and technical equipment, to mention a few. They must also be physically fit. While possession of a college degree can aid in obtaining employment in this profession, only extensive training provided at specialized facilities, combined with on-the-job training, can provide the skills and knowledge needed to perform the duties of a federal criminal investigator. As of 2012, there were 13,913 FBI agents, as of 2016, there were approximately 6,500 ICE-Homeland Security investigations (HSI) agents, and as of 2011, there were 4,890 DEA agents in the United States.

Criminal investigators and the use of the term Special Agent
Not all federal criminal investigators are called special agents. Some federal agencies entitle their investigators as criminal investigators but use the term interchangeably with special agent. Other federal agencies use different titles for the same 1811 criminal investigative job series. Series 1811 criminal investigators for the U.S. marshals are entitled deputy marshals. Series 1811 criminal investigators for the U.S Postal Inspection Service are called postal inspectors. These inspectors were originally called surveyors and received a title change in 1801 to Special Agent. In 1880, the U.S. Congress created the position of Chief Postal Inspector and renamed these special agents to postal inspectors. The first special agents in the United States were appointed in 1791 when the Secretary of the Treasury was authorized to employ "Special Agents" for the purpose of examining the accounts and books of the Collectors of Customs. The position of Special Treasury Agent was created, and until 1860 submitted reports to the Department of Treasury, through the Collectors of Customs in the Customs District in which they were employed.

State, county, municipal, and tribal governments
The state of Maryland has criminal investigators who are employed by the state attorney.  These investigators are called special investigators. As with special agents, these special investigators are authorized to conduct investigations, make arrests, carry firearms or other weapons, and carry a metallic badge.

In popular culture
Special agents, particularly those within the FBI, have been depicted in popular entertainment for years.

The title "Assistant Special Agent in Charge" and its acronym "ASAC" are stated frequently throughout the TV series Breaking Bad. For example, in Season 1 through Season 4, both Hank Schrader and Gus Fring are shown to be friendly with Hank's boss, ASAC George Merkert, and in Season 4 Episode 12 "End Times", Steve Gomez tells Dennis the "ASAC" is being pressured to search Gus's laundry for drugs. In Season 5, Hank – who is proud to have been promoted to the job vacated by his ousted boss – repeatedly chants "ASAC Schrader" to his baby niece Holly.

In the TV series White Collar, Peter Burke is the "Special Agent in Charge" (promoted from assistant Special Agent in Charge at the end of Season 6) and the head of the Manhattan White Collar Division.

In the TV series Criminal Minds several of the Behavioral Analysis Unit members are Supervisory Special Agents.

In the TV series The X Files, the title "Special Agent" is given to both Fox Mulder and Dana Scully of the Federal Bureau of Investigation. The title is referenced by them numerous times throughout each episode.

The main character from the TV series Twin Peaks, is FBI Special Agent Dale Cooper, and also, other FBI special agents make numerous cameos throughout the series, and its prequel movie, Twin Peaks: Fire Walk with Me.

"Dick Barton - Special Agent" was the subject of radio programs in the 1940s and later TV and film productions.

See also

 List of United States federal law enforcement agencies
 Bureau of Alcohol, Tobacco, Firearms and Explosives
 Detective
 Diplomatic Security Service, U.S. Department of State
 Drug Enforcement Administration
 Federal Bureau of Investigation
 Central Intelligence Agency
 Inspector
 Investigator (disambiguation)
 IRS Criminal Investigation
 Law enforcement agency
 Police rank
 Society of Former Special Agents of the Federal Bureau of Investigation
 State bureau of investigation
 State police
 U.S. Immigration and Customs Enforcement
 United States Marshals Service
 United States Secret Service
 Spy agent

References

American law enforcement officials
 
Legal professions
Police ranks
Law enforcement occupations
Positions of authority
Spies by role